Ryan Bambry is a New Zealand rugby union player who has played for Otago and the Highlanders. His usual position is fly-half.

References 

New Zealand rugby union players
Otago rugby union players
Highlanders (rugby union) players
1982 births
Living people
Rugby union fly-halves